Fathead may refer to:

Company
 Fathead (brand), a graphics company specializing in sports decorations and custom wall graphics

Fish
 Fathead carp
 Fathead minnow
 Fathead sculpin
 Cubiceps
 Semicossyphus pulcher of the family Labridae
 Psychrolutes microporos of the family Psychrolutidae

Music
 David "Fathead" Newman (1933-2009), American jazz and R&B saxophonist
 Fathead (album), Newman's debut release
 Fathead (musician) (c. 1960–1988), Jamaican dance hall deejay
 Fathead (band), Canadian blues band

Other uses
 Fat Head, a documentary criticizing Super Size Me and seeking to refute the lipid hypothesis